Mammillaria is a genus of the cactus family (Cactaceae).

Mammillaria may also refer to:
 Miliaria profunda, skin disease sometimes known as Mammillaria
Mammillary body, part of the brain

See also
Mammilla (disambiguation)